James F. Colaianni (August 6, 1922 – October 5, 2016) was an American Catholic lay theologian, author, publisher, lawyer, and activist.

Early life
He was born in Paterson, New Jersey in 1922. In 1939, Colaianni graduated from St. Joseph’s High School in Paterson, NJ and attended Seton Hall University. Colaianni served in the US Army during World War II in North Africa, Italy, France and Germany, attaining the rank of technical sergeant. Following his honorable discharge, his subsequent antiwar convictions began to emerge.

Career
Colaianni was admitted to the New Jersey Bar in 1948 after attending John Marshall School of Law. While in law school, he coached high school basketball and won a state championship. In the same period, he produced a series of widely publicized debates between William F. Buckley Jr. of National Review, and William Clancy of the liberal Catholic magazine Commonweal.

He earned his master's degree in Theology from the Institute of Lay Theology (ILT), based at the University of San Francisco, in 1963. As a member of the ILT, he served as Adult Religious Education Director from 1963 to 1965 at our Lady of Mount Carmel Catholic parish in Redwood City, California.

He was Managing Editor, Associate Publisher and Religion Editor of Ramparts Magazine from 1965 to 1967. In the August 1966 issue of Ramparts, Colaianni's article, "Napalm: Small Town Diary," documented resistance to the establishment of a napalm plant in Redwood City. It was the first article in the national press to condemn the manufacture and use of napalm in the Vietnam War. Colaianni led a protest of thousands against the use of napalm as a military weapon in Vietnam. He made national news as a spokesperson for the anti-napalm and anti-war movements, appearing on such programs as the NBC Nightly News with Walter Cronkite and the "Huntley-Brinkley Report."

Colaianni advocated the abolition of mandatory celibacy in the priesthood of the Catholic Church in his book Married Priests & Married Nuns (McGraw Hill). Another book, The Catholic Left: The Crisis of Radicalism in the Church (Chilton Publishing), is a study of the phenomenon of liberalism in the Catholic Church in America. Colaianni served as Executive Director of the National Liturgical Conference, Washington D.C. from 1967 to 1970. In that capacity, he produced one of the first "rock masses" on the national scene, featuring Minnie Riperton and the Rotary Connection, at the Liturgical Conference National Convention, Milwaukee Arena, in 1969, with thousands attending.

Beginning in 1970, Colaianni was publisher and principal author of Sunday Sermons, specializing in resource material for the preaching clergy, with worldwide distribution. As of 2006, Colaianni had written more than 2,000 sermons on a wide range of topics, many of which have been anthologized. He was also publisher of the Manual of Clinical Nutrition, 1985, and the journal Clinical Nutrition, edited by Dr. David M. Paige of Johns Hopkins University Medical School. They were distributed internationally to physicians and other health-care providers. He also published the Public Domain Report "Music Bibles and Public Domain Report newsletter 1993-1998, the first publication to catalog literary works, musical compositions, films, and works of visual arts as they entered the US public domain. The publication was edited by Scott A. Johnson, Colaianni's grandson. Sunday Sermons is currently published by James F. Colaianni, Jr.

Family
In 1950, Colaianni married Patricia Kelly Colaianni, the senior editor of his publishing company, Sunday Sermons. They had six children: Karen, Janice, Pamela, James, Louis and John.

Later life
With New York City-Village Gate's Art D'Lugoff, Colaianni was a co-producer of the musical One Mo’ Time at the Village Gate North, in Toronto, Ontario, Canada. He was the sole producer of Jazz America at the historic Warner Theatre, Washington, D.C.

He died at his home in Galloway, New Jersey, at 94.

See also
Priest shortage
List of peace activists

References 

Mitchell, George, How Do Those Guys Manage to Produce A Sermon Each Week? The Wall Street Journal; Mar 14, 1972; 1, Front Page.
Ramparts, vol. 4, 5, 6 numbers 1–12, 1965–1967
MacGuire, John – Review, The Problem of Celibacy, MARRIED PRIESTS AND MARRIED NUNS. New York Times, September 29, 1968, book review, Page BR63.
Davies, Lawrence E., Napalm Foes Petition for Vote To Bar Factory in Coast City. New York Times, April 17, 1966, Page 8.
Fiske, Edward B., End Papers. New York Times, October 26, 1968, page 35.
Turner, Wallace, Pacifists Balked in Napalm Fight; Judge Rejects Plan that would Shut Coast Plant. New York Times, May 21, 1966, page 4.
ABC Evening News for Monday, November 11, 1968, Catholics/Bishops Meeting, — James Colaianni speaks of crisis of authority problem in Catholic Church. Reported by Frank Reynolds.
Bid to Red Irks Catholic Publication. The Catholic Standard, official publication of the Roman Catholic Archdiocese of Washington has criticized the Liturgical Conference for inviting Communists to speak at its annual meeting. Washington Post, June 29, 1968, page B9. 
Bowman, James H., Snake Dance Ends Liturgy Session. Hundreds of Christian worshippers snake-danced on the floor of the Milwaukee Arena Monday in a worship service at the close of the first of the four-day National Liturgical Conference. Washington Post, August 30, 1969, page A13.
Hitchcock, James, The Recovery of the Sacred, Ignatius Press, 1995. Colaianni, James, 134–135.
Parham, Philip, Letting God: Christian Meditations for Recovery, HarperSanFrancisco, 1987. Colaianni, James, front matter, dedication.
Jenkins, Philip, The New Anti-Catholicism: The Last Acceptable Prejudice, Oxford University Press, 2003. Colaianni, James, cited.
McGreevey, John T., Parish Boundaries: The Catholic Encounter with Race in the Twentieth-Century Urban North, University of Chicago Press, 1998. Colaianni, James, cited.
Gleason, Philip, Contending with Modernity: Catholic Higher Education in the Twentieth Century, Oxford University Press, 1995. Colaianni, James, cited.
Polner, Murray and Jim O’Grady, Disarmed and Dangerous: The Radical Life and Times of Daniel and Philip Berrigan, Westview Press, 1998. Colaianni, James, cited.
Edwards, Dwight, Revolution Within: A Fresh Look at Supernatural Living, Waterbrook Press, 2001. Colaianni, James, cited.
Sipe, A. W. Richard, A Secret World, Routledge, 1990. Colaianni, James, cited.
Abbott, Elizabeth, A History of Celibacy, Da Cappo Press, 2001. Colaianni, James, cited.
Mathisen, Robert, Critical Issues in American Religious History: A Reader, Baylor University Press, 2001. Colaianni, James, page 665.

1922 births
2016 deaths
Writers from Paterson, New Jersey
Military personnel from New Jersey
American theologians
Lay theologians
American male non-fiction writers
Roman Catholic activists
Cleveland–Marshall College of Law alumni
Seton Hall University alumni
American anti–Vietnam War activists
American magazine editors
American publishers (people)
New Jersey lawyers
Writers from the San Francisco Bay Area
Activists from the San Francisco Bay Area
20th-century American lawyers
United States Army personnel of World War II